Ivanovskoye is a rural locality (a selo) in Shenkursky District, Arkhangelsk Oblast, Russia. The population was 57 as of 2010.

Geography 
It is located 47 km south-west from Shenkursk, on the Padenga River.

References 

Rural localities in Shenkursky District